Ignacy Posadzy SChr (February 17, 1898 – January 17, 1984) was a Polish Roman Catholic priest who ministered to Polish migrants from the interwar period, through World War II and during the rule of Communist Poland. At the direction of Venerable August Cardinal Hlond, he co-founded an order dedicated to serving Polish migrants, the Society of Christ. He served as Superior General of the Society from August 22, 1932, to July 5, 1968. In 1958, he founded an order of religious sisters, dedicated to serving Polish migrants, the Missionary Sisters of Christ the King.

During World War II, he was appointed spiritual leader of Polish slave laborers in Nazi Germany.

Early life 
Ignacy Posadzy was born on February 17, 1898, in Szadłowice, near Inowrocław, to Jakub and Katarzyna (née: Pawlak) Posadzy. His parents came from a very religious background and they raised their children according. Ignacy was their eighth child and was brought up in deep religious and patriotic traditions.

In 1905, when, at his primary school in Szadłowice, religion was taught in German instead of Polish, Ignacy started a strike together with all the children. He participated in this strike together with his sister Anna, who was two years his senior. After completing primary school, in 1908, he began attending gymnasium in Inowrocław. Ignacy successfully completed gymnasium despite the difficulties faced by Polish youth. Polish youth were required to have much greater knowledge of the German language and of other subjects than what was required of German youth. In turn, only a few Poles completed gymnasium and the subsequent final examination. During the partitions of Poland, Polish families taught the Polish language, Polish literature, history and culture secretly at home.

Seminary Formation 
In 1917, Posadzy entered the Archbishop's Seminary in Poznań. During World War I, he continued his studies in Münster and Fulda. It was there that Posadzy first encountered the plight of Polish emigrants. He witnessed the struggles of seasonal workers, particularly those from the Russian partition of Poland. Polish seasonal workers lived in the immediate vicinity of Münster and Fulda. He met with these workers many times. They complained to him about the hard working conditions, and especially about the lack of Polish pastoral care. As a seminarian, together with his fellow seminarians, he ministered to these migrants, gave lectures, and prayed together with them.

After the war ended, he completed his studies in the seminaries in Gniezno and Poznań. Posadzy was ordained a subdeacon on October 10, 1920. On December 5, 1920, he was ordained a deacon. On February 19, 1921, he was ordained a diocesan priest by Bishop Wilhelm Kloske in the Gniezno Cathedral.

Early priesthood 
After ordination, Fr. Posadzy worked in parish ministry in Poznań. His great preaching talent as well as his zeal for confession were soon noticed. After three years of work at the Poznań Fara, he was entrusted with the role of prefect at the State Teachers' Seminary in Poznań. He was recognized as a gifted writer. He became friends with Fr. Nikodem Cieszyński, editor of "Rocznik Katolicki" (The Catholic Yearbook). Fr. Posadzy also became a co-editor of "Biblioteka Kaznodziejska" (The Preacher's Library) and "Wiadomości dla Duchowieństwa" (News for the Clergy). He was also a member of the Polish Writers' Union.

Following his ordination, Fr. Posadzy spent his vacations traveling abroad, living among Polish emigrants. In 1923 he stayed in Saxony and Bavaria, where he organized services for Polish emigrants on Sundays and holidays. In July 1924 he spent time serving in Hesse. He made another pastoral journey in 1925. In August 1926, on behalf of the State Emigration Office, he left for Denmark. In 1928 he visited Polish communities in Romania. In 1929, sent by Venerable August Cardinal Hlond, he traveled to Brazil, Uruguay and Argentina to gather information regarding the Polish communities there. This visitation lasted from May to September 1929.

In May 1930, he attended in the International Eucharistic Congress in Carthage.

In 1930, again at the request of Venerable August Cardinal Hlond, Posadzy made another journey across the Atlantic to once again visit the Polish migrant communities in Brazil, Argentina, and Uruguay. This visitation lasted longer than the first, from June 1930 to June 1931.

In 1938, Fr. Posadzy published a memoir of his travels to the Polish Communities of South America titled "The Way of the Pilgrims" (Drogą Pielgrzymów).

Society of Christ 

In 1932, Venerable August Cardinal Hlond entrusted Fr. Posadzy with the establishment of a new religious order, the Society of Christ. He served as Superior General of the Society until 1968.

Founding the Society of Christ 
In 1930, prior to Fr. Posadzy's making his second visitation of the Polish communities in South America, Venerable August Cardinal Hlond asked Fr. Posadzy if he would consider leading a new religious order the Cardinal was seeking to establish. This order would later come to be known as the Society of Christ. This missionary order would send priests around the world to serve Polish migrants wherever they resided.

Venerable August Cardinal Hlond had considered entrusting the spiritual care of the  Polish diaspora ministry to a religious congregation for some time. He had come to see that sending diocesan priests for this sort of ministry had borne little fruit. Initially, the Cardinal had tried to pass the pastoral ministry of Poles in exile to the Resurrectionists or to the Oratorians. Neither of the proposals came to fruition He started to work toward founding a new religious congregation after Pope Pius XI explicitly recommended that such an order be founded.

In response to the Cardinal's request that he lead this new religious order, Fr. Posadzy initially replied that his health was poor and that he lacked the organizational skills for such an undertaking. Fr. Posadzy requested a few days to consider the Cardinal's proposal. The next day, however, Fr. Posadzy told the Cardinal that he was ready to undertake the task of organizing the new order. After his conversation with Cardinal Hlond, Fr. Posadzy went to the Dukla Forest, where, in the hermitage of St. John of Dukla, he made a private 10-day retreat.

After the retreat, Fr. Posadzy began promoting the mission of the emerging congregation. He organized lectures during which he reflected on his last trip to the Polish communities of South America. During these lectures, he displayed his own pictures depicting the life of Polish emigrants in South America. In Poznań, he gave a lecture at the "Słońce" cinema, which had the largest auditorium in the capital of Greater Poland. Cardinal Hlond was present at this lecture.

At the behest of Cardinal Hlond, Fr. Posadzy went to Godesberg in Germany, where in 1927 Bishop Franz Xaver Geyer founded a congregation for German migrants: "Gemeinschaft von den heiligen Engeln" (Congregation of the Holy Angels). Then Fr. Posadzy went to Italy to learn about the Scalabrinian order founded by Blessed Bishop Giovanni Scalabrini for the pastoral care of the Italian migrants. By the end of March 1932, Fr. Posadzy returned to Poznań. After returning to Poland, Fr. Posadzy continued to promote the new order by giving lectures and writing articles for the press.

On August 22, 1932, Cardinal Hlond gave his blessing for Fr. Posadzy begin the work of organizing the new order in earnest. Along with this blessing, the Cardinal gave Fr. Posadzy final instructions and a few fatherly words of encouragement saying: 
 So we begin In Nomine Domini. Let us trust God - He will surely help us. The next day, August 23, Fr. Posadzy traveled to Potulice, where Countess Aniela Potulicka had donated her mansion and surrounding grounds to serve as the mother house of the new order, the Society of Christ.

Potulice 
A few days after Fr. Posadzy arrived in Potulice, 20 candidates for the priesthood and 16 aspirants for religious brothers arrived. On October 15, 1932, the canonical novitiate began in Potulice.
On November 4, 1932, Fr. Posadzy enthroned the Sacred Heart of Jesus in the novitiate. The devotion to the Sacred Heart of Jesus was a central part of Fr. Posadzy's upbringing. In the main room of his family home, there was a large statue of the Sacred Heart of Jesus. The whole family often prayed at the foot of this statue. It was with his background that Fr. Posadzy, from the very beginning of the Society, emphasized the devotion to the Sacred Heart of Jesus for all members of the Society of Christ.The spiritual dynamism and apostolic enthusiasm present in the quiet of Potulice was due to the zeal of Fr. Posadzy. Fr. Posadzy followed the directives given to him by Cardinal Hlond. Fr. Posadzy also sought the help and advise of the nearby Pallottine priests in Suchary, as well as the number of priests like Fr. Aleksander Żychliński.

Fr. Posadzy became friends with Saint Maximilian Kolbe. Inspired by Saint Kolbe's Niepokalanów, Fr. Posadzy established a publishing house, a printing house, and a number of mechanical and craft workshops in Potulice. The Society began issuing the following magazines:  "Głos Seminarium Zagranicznego" (Voice of the International Seminary), "Msza Święta" (Holy Mass), "Cześć Świętych Polskich" (Veneration of Polish Saints). Many books were published by the Society's pre-war publishing house based in Potulice. Members of the Society distributed the Society's publications all over Poland, promoting the Society's mission and charism.Among all the intensive work of establishing the Society's operations in Poland, Fr. Posadzy did not lose sight of the Society's ultimate mission of serving Polish migrants abroad. As such, Fr. Posadzy maintained contact with Polish communities around the world. In the years prior to World War II, Fr. Posadzy traveled to various Polish communities around the world. In 1937, he traveled to the Far East to attended the 33rd International Eucharistic Congress in Manila. On the way to the Congress, he traveled through India where he was hosted by Mahatma Gandhi. During their meeting, the two held a philosophical-religious discussion regarding Truth. This discussion was documented in Fr. Posadzy's book, "Przez Tajemniczy Wschód" (Through the Mysterious East). Returning from the Philippines, Fr. Posadzy returned to Poland traveling through China, Japan, Korea, Manchuria and the Soviet Union.
At the end of June 1939, Fr. Posadzy traveled to Denmark for the Polish Youth Congress and to Metz, where the Catholic Congress of Poles from Eastern France was being held. After the Congress, he toured Polish pastoral centers. While in Lyon, he made a pilgrimage to Paray-le-Monial. On his way back, he visited London, where religious brothers had been working for a year in the Polish Catholic Mission.

World War II 
When in September 1939 World War II broke out, the Society of Christ already had 20 priests, 86 seminarians and about 200 brothers and postulants. As an eminently Polish organization, the Society found itself on the black list of the Nazi German occupant. Therefore, during the September campaign, Fr. Posadzy ordered the evacuation of the Society's mother house in Potulice. During the Nazi occupation, Fr. Ignacy  kept in touch members of the Society of Christ and organized new opportunities for pastoral work for the Society's priests.

In 1942, the priests of the Society of Christ managed to obtain a permit from the German authorities in Kraków for pastoral work in the so-called dulagach - transit camps for Poles deported to the Reich for forced labor. Eventually, all transit camps in the General Government received chaplains, mainly from among the Society's priests. This work was associated with great danger and, in several cases, ended with arrest and imprisonment in a concentration camp.

Fr. Posadzy sought opportunities for the Society's seminarians to complete their seminary studies at the seminaries of other religious orders or dioceses. He directed clerics to Kraków to continue their theological studies. During this time, 43 clerics were ordained priests.

Fr. Posadzy took care of seminarians and organized their ordinations. He also conducted many retreats for nuns. At great risk, he organized an 8-day retreat for priests of the Society of Christ in Kalwaria Zebrzydowska each year.

Post-War and Communist Poland 
After the  war, a new chapter began in the life of Fr. Posadzy and for the Society of Christ. At the request of the Society's founder, Venerable August Cardinal Hlond, Fr. Posadzy directed the Society's priests to Western Pomerania for pastoral work in the region's parishes. Fr. Posadzy regularly visited these parishes and encouraged the priests that worked there, often in very difficult conditions. His commitment to properly forming the Society's priests are shown in the texts of conferences he delivered on the priesthood. He delivered many of these conferences during priestly retreats.

Fr. Posadzy also put a great effort into preparing new priests. He prioritized seminary formation and reopened the Society's novitiate immediately after the war. A few years later, he opened the Society's minor seminary. The major seminary was opened soon after.

Fr. Posadzy relaunched the Society's publishing house and restarted issuing the monthly magazine "Msza Święta" (Holy Mass) after the wartime disruption.

When it was possible to obtain a passport for travel, Fr. Posadzy traveled to Rome and had an audience with Pope Venerable Pius XII to discuss the future of the Society of Christ. The Pope encouraged Fr. Posadzy to continue his work and granted an apostolic blessing.

Fr. Posadzy, like most Catholic leaders in Communist Poland, had to navigate an extremely hostile, and often dangerous, political climate. The Communist Government of Poland looked at the Society of Christ with suspicion and often created difficulties for the Society. Fr. Posadzy approached these challenges decisively, seeking to fulfill the Society's mission, while keeping his integrity, and the integrity of the Society, intact. When the director of the communist Office for Religious Affairs came to bestow Fr. Posadzy with a honoric distiniction for supposed contributions to the People's Republic of Poland, Fr. Posadzy took the order and returned it to the bureaucrat, placing it in the director coat pocket. Fr. Posadzy refused to be associated in any way with the Polish communist party and the anti-Catholic campaign they regularly waged against the Catholic Church.

When in 1958 he founded the Missionary Sisters of Christ the King, Fr. Posadzy evaded the communist ban on founding new religious congregations by claiming that simply opened another Felician convent.The work of Fr. Posadzy's life, the Society of Christ, came of age in 1950 when it was recognized in the Church and received its "decretum laudis" (decree of praise) from the Holy See. In 1951, the General Chapter of the Society of Christ bestowed upon him the title of co-founder of the Society. Final approval of the Society of Christ was granted by the Holy See in 1964. Fr. Posadzy met with Pope Paul VI around this time. Soon after, in 1968, Fr. Posadzy retired from his role as Superior General of the Society of Christ.

Missionary Sisters of Christ the King 

In 1958, following a suggestion Venerable August Cardinal Hlond once gave him, he founded another religious order, the Missionary Sisters of Christ the King. The founding decree was signed on November 21, 1959, by the Archbishop of Poznań, Antoni Baraniak. The Missionary Sisters continue to serve Polish migrants around the world.

Later years 
In 1968, after 36 years of serving as the Superior General of the Society of Christ, Fr. Posadzy retired, submitting himself to a life of prayer and spiritual leadership of the Society. He devoted himself to prayer and meditation in the last years of his life with deep faith.

In 1971, during Fr. Posadzy's golden jubilee of priesthood,  Blessed Stefan Cardinal Wyszyński celebrated a Holy Mass in the Poznań cathedral. During his homily he said of Fr. Posadzy: 

 We can thank God that you understood your priesthood in such a way that it carried you across seas and lands to serve the People of God with a living word and bestow upon those people the power of the Holy Sacraments. You preached God's teaching, not your own. Teachings that were derived from Christ's sacrifice on the cross. This is how you understood your priesthood and this is how you fulfilled it.

Death and burial 
Ignacy Posadzy died on January 17, 1984, in Puszczykowo. He was buried at the Society of Christ's burial plot at the Miłostowo cemetery in Poznań.Pope John Paul II, hearing about the death of Fr. Posadzy, sent a telegram to the Society of Christ: 
 After the death of Father Ignacy Posadzy, co-founder of the Society of Christ and founder of the Missionary Sisters of Christ the King, I mourn and pray with the orphaned congregations and, on the hands of the Superior General of the Society, I express my sympathy. Together with you, I thank Almighty God for the long life and work of a man whose character was shaped by grace and who served as a minister of grace. A man who is deeply inscribed in the contemporary history of the Church in Poland, a man of faith, contemplation and service--a Man of God. With Christ, the Eternal Priest, he drew upon God's power to carry out his ministry in order to build up the Body of Christ (Eph 4:12). Let us pray that our savior accepts his servant to the joy of heaven. Let us pray too that the legacy of this servant continue to grow and develop through his spiritual sons and daughters. From the depths of my heart, I bless both Congregations, the family and friends of Fr. Posadzy, as well as those who attend his funeral. 
John Paul II, Pope. 
The Vatican, January 21, 1984. 

In 2007, his body was exhumed as part of the cause for his beatification. His remains are now interred in a chapel at the Society of Christ's headquarters in Poznań.

Cause for beatification 

On June 16, 1999, in a letter to the Archbishop of Poznań, the Superior General of the Society of Christ, Fr. Tadeusz Winnicki SChr, formally requested that a cause for the beatification of Fr. Posadzy be opened. On May 23, 2000, the Congregation for the Causes of Saints issued a nihil obstat granting its permission for the cause to proceed. On January 17, 2001, a ceremony at the Poznań Cathedral marked the beginning of the beatification process on the diocesan level during which evidence of Fr. Posadzy's heroic virtue would be gathered. On January 12, 2007, Fr. Posadzy's earthy remains were exhumated and identified. They were interred later in a chapel at the headquarters of the Society of Christ.

On May 6, 2009, the diocesan investigation was completed and a report was prepared for submission to the Congregation for the Causes of Saints. On June 19, 2009, the report and its related documents were submitted to the Congregation. On September 3, 2009, the Congregation issued a decree allowing the cause to proceed to its next phase in Rome. On November 23, 2009, the Holy See began its review of the submitted report. After reviewing the report, the Congregation issued a decree validating the diocesan investigation and granting Fr. Posadzy the title of Servant of God. On June 21, 2018, the Positio super vita, virtutibus et fama sanctitatis was submitted to the Congregation for review. The Positio was reviewed by the Congregation's Theological Commission on November 30, 2021. On December 1, 2021, the Theological Commission announced that it had judged the Positio "positively", concurring with the Positio's assertion of Fr. Posadzy's heroic virtue. The Positio was positively reviewed by a commission of Cardinals and Bishops on December 13, 2022. The cause was then presented to the Pope for final approval who, on December 17, 2022, recognized Fr. Posadzy's heroic virtue and declared Fr. Posadzy Venerable.

References 

1898 births
1984 deaths
People from Inowrocław County
Polish Roman Catholic priests
Society of Christ Fathers